Delias levicki is a species of pierine butterfly endemic to Mindanao, in the Philippines.

The wingspan is 65–75 mm.

Subspecies
Delias levicki levicki (Mt. Apo, Mindanao)
Delias levicki borromeoi Schroder & Treadaway, 1984 (Mt. Palket, southern Mindanao)
Delias levicki justini Samusawa & Kawamura, 1988 (Mt. Kitanlad, northern Mindanao)
Delias levicki hokamae Nakano, 1995 (Mt. Matutum, southern Mindanao)
Delias levicki mandaya Yamamoto & Takei, 1982 (Mt. Tagubud, Mindanao)

References

levicki
Butterflies described in 1927